Koruna may refer to:

Currencies
 Austro-Hungarian krone, localized as koruna in Czech/Slovak
 Bohemian and Moravian koruna
 Czech koruna or Czech crown, the only currency in use with the name
 Czechoslovak koruna
 Hungarian korona, localized as koruna in Slovak
 Slovak koruna

Other uses 
Koruna (Svitavy District), a village in the Czech Republic
Koruna česká, a Czech monarchist group
Jabar Koruna, a village in Pakistan
Zlatá Koruna, a village in the Czech Republic

See also
Krona (disambiguation)